George Selden may refer to:
George B. Selden (1846–1922), American inventor
George Selden (author) (1929–1989), American children's writer

See also
George Seldes (1890–1995), American investigative journalist and media critic